Haplocochlias concepcionensis is a species of sea snail, a marine gastropod mollusk in the family Skeneidae.

References

 Keen M. (1971) Sea shells of tropical West America. Marine mollusks from Baja California to Perú, ed. 2. Stanford University Press. 1064 pp.
 Rubio F., Fernández-Garcés R. & Rolán E. 2013. The genus Haplocochlias (Gastropoda, Skeneidae). Iberus, 31(2): 41–126 page(s): 96–98

concepcionensis
Gastropods described in 1933